Jarrad Breen (born 6 October 1992) is a Welsh international lawn and indoor bowler.

Bowls career
Breen became a National champion in 2017 when he won the fours title at the Welsh National Bowls Championships and the following year became a National champion for the second time, after winning the triples title. He also won the 2017 IIBC Championships singles. In 2021, Breen reached the final of the pairs and fours at the 2021 Welsh National Bowls Championships.

In 2022, he competed in the men's pairs and the men's fours at the 2022 Commonwealth Games. Partnering Daniel Salmon he won the pairs gold medal.

Family
His brother Jack Breen is also an international bowler.

References

Welsh male bowls players
1992 births
Living people
Bowls players at the 2022 Commonwealth Games
Commonwealth Games gold medallists for Wales
Commonwealth Games medallists in lawn bowls
Medallists at the 2022 Commonwealth Games